Antonio Politano (born 17 January 1967) is an Italian former professional racing cyclist. He rode in the 1995 Tour de France.

References

External links
 

1967 births
Living people
Italian male cyclists
Sportspeople from Pisa
Cyclists from Tuscany